The 1909–10 Columbia Lions men's basketball team represented Columbia University in intercollegiate basketball during the 1909–10 season. The team finished the season with an 11–0 record (the Alumni game that Columbia lost does not count in official NCAA records) and were named national champions by the Helms Athletic Foundation. Player Ted Kiendl was named to the 1910 All-American team at the end of the season.

Schedule and results

|-
!colspan=9 style="background:#75b2dd; color:#FFFFFF;"| Regular season

Source

References

Columbia Lions men's basketball seasons
Columbia
NCAA Division I men's basketball tournament championship seasons
Columbia Lions Men's Basketball Team
Columbia Lions Men's Basketball Team